Yoel Lavi (born 8 February 1950) is an Israeli politician who was the mayor of Ramla in Israel.

Lavi was a member of Kadima, he was 114th on the party's list for the 2009 Knesset elections. He holds a B.Sc. degree in History from the Tel Aviv University and an M.A degree in Mathematics and Social Sciences, from the University of Haifa.

External links

1950 births
Living people
Jewish Israeli politicians
Kadima politicians
Mayors of places in Israel
People from Ramla
Tel Aviv University alumni
University of Haifa alumni